Elena Likhovtseva and Vera Zvonareva were the defending champions, but neither chose to participate this year.

Janette Husárová and Paola Suárez won the title, defeating Hsieh Su-wei and Shikha Uberoi 6–0, 6–2 in the final.

Seeds

Draw

Draw

References

External links
Sonyericssonwtatour.com

WTA Auckland Open